Dor is a rural locality (a village) in Tolshmenskoye Rural Settlement, Totemsky District, Vologda Oblast, Russia. The population was 4 as of 2002.

Geography 
Dor is located 98 km south of Totma (the district's administrative centre) by road. Frolovo is the nearest rural locality.

References 

Rural localities in Totemsky District